Lorella Cravotta (born 9 April 1958) is a French comedian and actress. She is best known for her role in the cult TV series Les Deschiens (1993–2002), in which she appears alongside Yolande Moreau.

Theatre

Filmography

References

External links

1958 births
Living people
People from Gard
French film actresses